Zennor Quoit is a ruined megalithic burial chamber or dolmen, located on a moor about a mile (1.6 km) east of the village of Zennor, Cornwall, England, UK. It dates to 2500–1500 BC. Aside from the  roof, which collapsed some time between 1770 and 1865, the chamber is in good condition.

Structural description
Zennor Quoit is located on the West Penwith moors about a mile to the east of the village of Zennor (OS coordinate SW468380). It is accessed by the B3306 road about two miles from St. Ives. From the road, the site may be reached via a trail from a spot named "Eagle's Nest" (OS coordinate SW468387).

The quoit measures  in total in diameter. The chamber itself consists of seven upright stones and was originally covered by a cairn. It had a small porch at its entrance for the purpose of entering the chamber and also had an antechamber with an even smaller entrance.

 to the east is Sperris Quoit, although this is in a considerably less fine state than the Zennor Quoit.

History
The chamber dates to between 2500 and 1500 BC and is one of eight remaining quoits on the West Penwith moors. Archaeological evidence unearthed on the site has indicated that the chamber was used for the burial of bodies which at some point would be cremated and removed and replaced with others. The purpose of the exterior stones are believed to have been for resting the dead bodies against for the flesh to be devoured by birds before burial.  Excavations at the site have revealed flint and Neolithic style pottery and cremated bones.

A local legend is associated with the chamber in that it is said  that the quoit possesses mystical powers and that removed stones from the structure would soon mysteriously find their way back in the middle of the night. In 1754 and in 1769, before the roof had fallen, the quoit was analysed by the antiquary Dr. William Borlase (1695–1772), who described and provided detailed drawings of it and published some of his findings in his Antiquities of Cornwall (1769).

In 1861, a local farmer proposed to convert the monument into a cattle–shed by removing one of the upright pillars and drilling a hole in the sloping capstone. The vandalism soon reached the disapproving ears of the villagers of Zennor and the local vicar, William Borlase (a great-grandson of Dr. William Borlase), intervened and successfully offered a financial incentive of five shillings to the farmer to build it elsewhere, although he had already built stone posts on the site to erect it. Traces of drill–holes can still be seen in the stone

In 1882, a member of the Borlase family came to the defence of the quoit again when the Penzance Natural History and Antiquarian Society visited the site. The following account was reported:

Every year, the Old Cornwall Society meets behind the chamber on Midsummer's Eve and lights a ritual bonfire.

Literature
Charles Taylor Stephens (d. 1863 in St Ives) was a shoemaker and the local postman from St Ives to Zennor who wrote a poem about the attempt to convert the quoit into a cattleshed. He was also employed by Robert Hunt to help in the collecting of folk tales from the Zennor area.

Gallery

References

Archaeological sites in Cornwall
Dolmens in Cornwall
Zennor